Jamir Adriano Paz Gomes (born 13 May 1972) is a retired Brazilian professional footballer who played as a defensive midfielder.

Club career
Born in Uruguaiana, Gomes is a product of São José youth system, from where he moved to the larger Grêmio in 1987. At the Tricolour side, he was part of squad that finished runner-up in the 1993 Copa do Brasil, and won it in the following year, while also bagging a regional title.

In 1995, he joined Botafogo, helping the team win their first league title in their history under Paulo Autuori leadership. In the summer of 1996, Gomes reunited with Autuori at Benfica, but rarely played as Amaral was regular starter.

He was subsequently loaned out to Flamengo, staying for two years, and losing another Copa do Brasil. The 28-year-old then signed with Alverca, which had just recently been promoted to the top tier, playing alongside Kulkov in the last of his two seasons spent there.

After leaving Portugal, he had short stints in various clubs, the larger being Vasco da Gama and Portuguesa, retiring at age 33 in 2005.

Honours
 Grémio
 Campeão da Copa do Brasil: 1994
 Campeão do Campeonato Gaúcho:1993
 Botafogo
 Série A:1995

References

External links
 

1972 births
Living people
Footballers from Porto Alegre
Brazilian footballers
Association football midfielders
Campeonato Brasileiro Série A players
Esporte Clube São José players
Grêmio Foot-Ball Porto Alegrense players
Botafogo de Futebol e Regatas players
Brazilian expatriate footballers
Brazilian expatriate sportspeople in Portugal
Expatriate footballers in Portugal
Primeira Liga players
S.L. Benfica footballers
CR Flamengo footballers
F.C. Alverca players
Expatriate footballers in Peru
Brazilian expatriate sportspeople in Peru
Coronel Bolognesi footballers
CR Vasco da Gama players
Associação Portuguesa de Desportos players
Associação Atlética Portuguesa (Santos) players
Brasiliense Futebol Clube players
Clube de Regatas Brasil players
20th-century Brazilian people
21st-century Brazilian people